The City Council of Rome or Capitoline Assembly (Italian: Assemblea Capitolina) is the top tier legislative body of Rome, Italy. It consists of the directly elected mayor of Rome and of an elected 48-member assembly. It represents a legislative body which can also control the mayor's policy guidelines and be able to enforce their resignation by a motion of no confidence.

The city council is elected for a five-year term and is based on a direct choice for the candidate with a preference vote: the candidate with the majority of the preferences is elected. The number of seats for each party is determined by a mechanism of majority bonus.

The city council meets at Palazzo Senatorio, seated in Piazza del Campidoglio.

Composition

The political system of the Comuni of Italy was changed in 1993, when a semi-presidential system for the mayoral election was introduced. If until that year the council was elected under a pure proportional system and the council had the power to elect and dismiss the mayor of Rome, since 1993 the mayor and the council are jointly elected by citizens, with an electoral law that assures to the elected mayor a political majority in the council.

Under this system, the election of the mayor is prior over the election of the council. Voters express a direct choice for the mayor or an indirect choice voting for the party of the candidate's coalition and this gives a result whereby the winning candidate is able to claim majority support in the new council. The candidate who is elected mayor has always a majority of 62% of seats (29 seats) in the city council, which will support him during his term. The seats for each party of the coalition which wins the majority is determined proportionally.

In this type of system, the council is generally elected for a five-year term, but, if the mayor suffers a vote of no confidence, resigns or dies, under the simul stabunt, simul cadent clause introduced in 1993 (literally they will stand together or they will fall together), also the Council is dissolved and a snap election is called.

The City Committee (Italian: giunta comunale), the executive body of the city, chosen and presided directly by the mayor, is generally composed by members of the city council, which lost their membership into the assembly.

Functions
The council acts as the supreme legislative body of the city. It is convened and chaired by a speaker (president del consiglio comunale) appointed by the council itself.

The council can decide over programs and public works projects, institution and system of taxes, the general rules for the use of goods and services, forecasting and reporting financial statements. Resolution basic acts attributed by law to its competence are the municipal statute, the regulations, the general criteria on the structure of offices and services.

Speakers
This is a list of the speakers (Italian: presidenti del consiglio comunale) of the city council since the 1993 electoral reform:

Political composition

Historical composition

Current composition

|- style="background-color:#E9E9E9;text-align:center;"
! colspan="4" rowspan="1" style="text-align:left;" | Parties and coalitions
! colspan="1" | Votes
! colspan="1" | %
! colspan="1" | Seats
|-
| style="background-color:pink" rowspan="7" |
| style="background-color:" |
| style="text-align:left;" | Democratic Party (Partito Democratico)
| PD
| 166,194 || 16.38 || 18
|-
| style="background-color:#C32148" |
| style="text-align:left;" | Gualtieri for Mayor (Gualtieri Sindaco)
| GS
| 54,779 || 5.40 || 5
|-
| style="background-color:" |
| style="text-align:left;" | Civic Ecologic Left (Sinistra Civica Ecologista)
| SCE
| 20,501 || 2.02 || 2
|-
| style="background-color:#f01c6b" |
| style="text-align:left;" | Future Rome (Roma Futura)
| RF
| 20,028 ||1.97 || 2
|-
| style="background-color:" |
| style="text-align:left;" | Solidary Democracy (Democrazia Solidale)
| DemoS
| 9,610 || 0.95 || 1
|-
| style="background-color:" |
| style="text-align:left;" | Green Europe (Europa Verde)
| EV
| 9,354 || 0.92 || 1
|-
| style="background-color:" |
| style="text-align:left;" | Italian Socialist Party (Partito Socialista Italiano)
| PSI
| 2,841 || 0.28 || 0
|- style="background-color:pink"
| style="text-align:left;" colspan="4" | Gualtieri coalition (Centre-left)
| 283,307 || 27.92 || 29
|-
| style="background-color:lightblue" rowspan="6" |
| style="background-color:" |
| style="text-align:left;" | Brothers of Italy (Fratelli d'Italia)
| FdI
| 176,809 || 17.42 || 5
|-
| style="background-color:" |
| style="text-align:left;" | League (Lega)
| Lega
| 60,183 || 5.93 || 2
|-
| style="background-color:" |
| style="text-align:left;" | Forza Italia–Union of the Centre (Forza Italia–Unione di Centro)
| FI-UDC
| 36,444 || 3.59 || 2
|-
| style="background-color:#074A94"|
| style="text-align:left;" | Michetti for Mayor (Michetti Sindaco)
| MS
| 25,048 || 2.47 || 0
|-
| style="background-color:#56A5EC" |
| style="text-align:left;" | Reinassance (Rinascimento)
| 
| 18,659 || 1.84 || 0
|-
| style="background-color:#0000AC" |
| style="text-align:left;" | European Liberal Party
| PLE
| 1,371 || 0.14 || 0
|- style="background-color:lightblue"
| colspan="4" style="text-align:left;" | Michetti coalition (Centre-right)
| 318,514 || 31.39 || 9
|-
| style="background-color:" |
| style="text-align:left;" colspan="2" | Calenda for Mayor (Calenda Sindaco)
| CS
| 193,477 || 19.06 || 5
|-
| style="background-color:gold" rowspan="3" |
| style="background-color:" |
| style="text-align:left;" | Five Star Movement (Movimento Cinque Stelle)
| M5S
| 111,668 || 11.0 || 4
|-
| style="background-color:#e9b20a" |
| style="text-align:left;" | Raggi for Mayor (Raggi Sindaco)
| RS
| 43,581 || 4.29 || 1
|-
| style="background-color:" |
| style="text-align:left;" | Others 
| 
| 24,333 || 2.41 || 0
|- style="background-color:gold"
| colspan="4" style="text-align:left;" | Raggi coalition
| 179,582 || 17.70 || 5
|-
| style="background-color:" |
| style="text-align:left;" colspan="2" | Others 
| 
| 39,958 || 3.93 || 0
|-
| colspan="7" style="background-color:#E9E9E9" | 
|- style="font-weight:bold;"
| style="text-align:left;" colspan="4" | Total
| 1,014,838 || 100.00 || 48
|-
| colspan="7" style="background-color:#E9E9E9" | 
|-
| style="text-align:left;" colspan="4" | Votes cast / turnout 
| 1,145,268 || 48.54 || style="background-color:#E9E9E9;" |
|-
| style="text-align:left;" colspan="4" | Eligible voters
| 2,359,248 ||  || style="background-color:#E9E9E9;" |
|-
| colspan="7" style="background-color:#E9E9E9" | 
|-
| style="text-align:left;" colspan="7" | Source: Ministry of the Interior
|}
Notes

References

Organizations with year of establishment missing
City councils in Italy
Politics of Italian regions
Organisations based in Rome